Maximum Games, Inc. is an American video game publisher based in Walnut Creek, California. Originally founded in 2009 as a publisher of family-oriented titles for the Nintendo DS and Nintendo Wii, the company shifted to publishing games of all genres for all ages across all platforms shortly after inception.

Maximum Games has acted as a sub-publisher and North American distributor for many other major video game publishers including Nacon, Microids, Funcom, and Focus Home Interactive. Some of the most notable franchises they have partnered on include the Farming Simulator series, Five Nights at Freddy's, Bendy and the Ink Machine, Power Rangers: Battle for the Grid, Divinity: Original Sin, and the WRC series.

Maximum Games expanded into funding and development with a new publishing label in 2018 called Modus Games. In 2019, the company acquired its first studio, Brazilian-based The Balance, Inc. and rebranded it as Modus Studios Brazil.

History 
Maximum Games is a privately held California corporation, and was founded as "Maximum Family Games" in 2009 by Christina Seelye and Len Ciciretto. During the 2009 holiday season, the company launched two successful Nintendo DS titles, Junior Brain Trainer and Junior Classic Games, with placement in major US retailers. In 2010, the company published 16 new products for the Nintendo DS, Wii and PC platforms. In the same year, the company was granted third-party publishing status with Nintendo of America and Sony Computer Entertainment America, and in 2011, they were granted the same status in Europe with both companies. In 2012, the company also secured its license with Microsoft. That May, the company legally changed its name to Maximum Games.

Following the rebrand, Maximum Games began rapidly expanding into sales and physical distribution in North America for European publishers, specifically for the seventh console generation. The company's output averaged around eight releases per year, handling packaging, third-party logistics, and negotiating with retailers to secure placements for physical releases. By 2015, the company had invested $2.5 million in future games and shipped a total of 1 million units across all releases.

In March 2016, Maximum Games acquired UK-based video game publisher and distributor Avanquest Software Publishing Ltd. The acquisition marked Maximum's move to expand distribution of its games globally, establishing a European sales and marketing position. During this time, they also established a second European subsidiary, Maximum Games Ireland Limited.

In 2017, Maximum Games began development of its first fully owned IP, Extinction, which released in the following year. The expansion into development would lay the foundation for its publishing label Modus Games, focusing on AAA publishing services for independent developers. During this same time, the company further developed its European network of partners and retailers, offering games in over 30+ countries.

In 2018, Len Ciciretto transitioned out of the company and is no longer a shareholder.

In October 2020, Maximum Games entered an agreement with Nacon to handle third-party logistics for their lineup of RIG computer and gaming accessories.

Maximum Games began offering direct-to-consumer shipping from its own digital storefront in December 2020. It currently sells partner titles, Modus Games titles, and store exclusive collector's editions.

The company was purchased by Swedish firm Zordix AB in November 2021, for a total of $42 million, with additional earnouts of up to $30 million.

Modus Games 
In December 2017, Maximum Games created a new division of the company called Modus Games, focused on providing full-service publishing services to independent video game developers. Modus Games' first title published was action-adventure title Extinction, developed by Iron Galaxy.

In 2019, Modus Games purchased the independent Brazilian game studio The Balance, Inc., which it previously partnered with to publish the action game Override: Mech City Brawl. The company was rebranded as Modus Studios Brazil and operates independently of the publishing arm, offering porting, development support, and development of original IPs.

History 
Modus Games was first introduced in 2018 when the company was soft launched with the release of Iron Galaxy's Extinction. The company was fully launched in March 2019. Their first title as a publishing label was Finnish developer Frozenbyte's Trine 4: The Nightmare Prince, which received favorable reviews.

Modus Games has since partnered with several developers of varying sizes for both physical and digital releases globally. The company has made their first foray into the collectibles market with the announcement of a collector's edition for Dreams Uncorporated's action role-playing game Cris Tales.

In October 2020, Modus Games initiated an ongoing charitable initiative called Games Giving Back, in which the company donates a portion of each games' profits towards a charity, often in a similar theme to each game being highlighted. The first of these donations was to the Exceptional Women Awardees Foundation, an organization that helps women advance their careers through coaching and mentorship.

In January 2022, Modus Games acquired Mane6, the development team behind Them's Fightin' Herds.

Modus Studios Brazil 
Following the release of Override: Mech City Brawl by Brazilian studio The Balance, Inc., Modus Games purchased and rebranded the developer as Modus Studios Brazil in 2019. The company operates independently of the publishing arm, and has since released a sequel titled Override 2: Super Mech League. It is the company's first developer acquisition under the Modus name. In addition to development, the studio also co-develops and offers porting services for other Modus published games.

List of video games 
Games published and/or developed

Notes

Notable titles
A Plague Tale: Innocence
Bendy and the Ink Machine
Call of Cthulhu
Car Mechanic Simulator 2018
Conan Exiles
Farming Simulator series
Five Nights at Freddy's: Help Wanted
GreedFall
Infinite Air with Mark McMorris
Minecraft: Story Mode
Nickelodeon Kart Racers
Power Rangers: Battle for the Grid
SnowRunner
Spintires: MudRunner
The Golf Club 2
The Sinking City
The Surge
Vampyr
Werewolf: The Apocalypse – Earthblood
Doctor Who: Duo Bundle

References

External links
 

2009 establishments in California
Video game companies established in 2009
American companies established in 2009
Video game publishers
Video game companies based in California
Companies based in Contra Costa County, California
Walnut Creek, California
Software companies based in the San Francisco Bay Area
2021 mergers and acquisitions
American subsidiaries of foreign companies